The Vesper-Buick Auto Company Building, at 3900-3912 W. Pine in St. Louis, Missouri, was built in 1927.  It was listed on the National Register of Historic Places in 1986.

It was designed by architect Preston J. Bradshaw. The building had two floors and it was deemed notable as "one of St. Louis' best commercial examples of Spanish Colonial Revival, a style infrequently found in the city. The building features a stucco exterior, tile parapet, decorative metal grillwork and a lavish display of terra cotta ornament."

The building’s period of significance was during 1925-1949. The building was demolished in 1995  despite being included in the National Register of Historic Places.

References

		
National Register of Historic Places in St. Louis
Mission Revival architecture in Missouri
Buildings and structures completed in 1927